Isle of Palms is a city in Charleston County, South Carolina, United States. At the 2010 census, the population was 4,133. Isle of Palms is a barrier island on the South Carolina coast. The city is included within the Charleston-North Charleston-Summerville metropolitan area and the Charleston-North Charleston Urbanized Area. The town lies along a narrow strip of land, hugging the beach, separated from the mainland by the Intracoastal Waterway. It is a community of both vacation home owners and year-round residents, with large beachfront homes, resorts, and local restaurants. Beach volleyball is popular in the summer, and the "Windjammer" club hosts several tournaments throughout the year.

Geography
Isle of Palms is located along the Atlantic Ocean,  by road east of downtown Charleston.

Demographics

2020 census

As of the 2020 United States census, there were 4,347 people, 1,799 households, and 1,325 families residing in the city.

2010 census
As of the census of 2010, there were 4,133 people living in the city. The population density was 743.6 people per square mile (287.1/km2). There were 4,274 housing units at an average density of 868.7 per square mile (296.8/km2). The racial makeup of the city was 97.65% White, 1.06% Hispanic or Latino, 0.56% African American, 0.75% Asian, 0.15% Native American, 0.17% from other races, and 0.73% from two or more races.

There were 1,828 households, of which 20.1% had children under the age of 18 living with them, 62.4% were married couples living together, 6.4% had a female householder with no husband present, and 28.8% were non-families. 20.9% of all households were made up of individuals, and 7.5% had someone living alone who was 65 years of age or older. The average household size was 2.26 and the average family size was 2.66.

The city population was spread out, with 17.0% under the age of 18, 3.2% from 18 to 24, 23.8% from 25 to 49, 31.8% from 50 to 64, and 22.6% who were 65 years of age or older. The median age was 47. For every 100 females, there were 98 males.

The median income for a household in the city was $76,170, and the median income for a family was $88,874. Males had a median income of $60,640 versus $37,500 for females. The per capita income for the city was $44,221. About 1.7% of families and 3.4% of the population were below the poverty line, including 4.3% of those under age 18 and 1.0% of those age 65 or over.

Government
The city is run by an elected Mayor-council government system.

Mayor
Phillip Pounds

Council members
Randy Bell, Ryan L. Buckhannon, Jimmy Carroll (Mayor), John Moye, Kevin Popson, Phillip Pounds, Rusty Streetman, Susan Hill Smith, Jimmy Ward.

History

The island's original inhabitants were the Sewee tribe.

During the Civil War, the Confederate submarine H.L. Hunley departed from Breach Inlet, between Isle of Palms and neighboring Sullivan's Island.

In the late nineteenth century, local residents began using the island as a vacation spot. At that time it was only accessible by ferry. It was bought by J.S. Lawrence in 1899, who gave the island its current name; before then it was known as "Hunting Island" or "Long Island". A 50-room hotel was built in 1906. In 1912, James Sottile had a beach pavilion and an amusement park built, and a trolley line was constructed from Mount Pleasant on the mainland to Isle of Palms via Sullivan's Island. In 1929, Grace Memorial Bridge was built between Charleston and Mount Pleasant to allow automobile traffic to reach the island.

Large-scale residential development began when J.C. Long bought up most of the island and built low-cost housing for World War II veterans. In 1975, the Sea Pines Company (of Hilton Head Island fame) established the  development now known as the Wild Dunes Beach and Racquet Club.

E. Lee Spence, a pioneer underwater archaeologist and prolific author of books and articles about shipwrecks and sunken treasure, discovered, with the help of Isle of Palms residents Wally Shaffer and George Campsen, many shipwrecks along the shores of the Isle of Palms in the 1960s. Their discoveries included the Civil War blockade runners Rattlesnake, Stonewall Jackson, Mary Bowers, Constance, Norseman and the Georgiana. The iron-hulled steamer Georgiana, which was sunk on her maiden voyage, was described in contemporary documents as pierced for 14 guns and more powerful than the famous Confederate cruiser Alabama. These historic discoveries resulted in the passage of South Carolina's Underwater Antiquities Act allowing the archaeological salvage of shipwrecks.

During Hurricane Hugo, which struck September 21, 1989, much of the island was flooded by the storm surge.

The northeastern end of the Isle of Palms, which is home to the private community of Wild Dunes, endured a severe erosion crisis as a shoal attached to that section of the island and caused sand to be washed away from around the foundation of a large condominium. The city undertook a controversial beach restoration project in the spring and summer of 2008 which replenished the beach with dredged sand and saved the threatened structures.

In February 2019, it was reported that the city's police force was undergoing a crisis following several resignations.

County parks 
The Charleston County Park and Recreation Commission (CCPRC) operates numerous facilities within Charleston County including Isle of Palms County Park.

Marinas and boat landings:
 Cooper River Marina
 Multiple county-wide boat landings

See also
Lucas v. South Carolina Coastal Council

References

External links

 Official website of Isle of Palms
 Island Eye News, bi-weekly newspaper of Isle of Palms and Sullivan's Island

Cities in Charleston County, South Carolina
Cities in South Carolina
Charleston–North Charleston–Summerville metropolitan area
Populated coastal places in South Carolina